"the alt.sessions" is a Canadian television series, capturing bands playing alternative versions of their songs in a unique and meaningful setting. It was launched on aux.tv, a Canadian music website, and BiteTV, a digital cable channel, in late 2008 and currently airs on both.

The show aims to profile new and emerging artists in alternative rock, hip hop, indie rock, alternative country and other genres.

Episodes

External links 
 the alt.sessions
 

2008 Canadian television series debuts
2000s Canadian music television series
Canadian non-fiction web series